Fexinidazole is a medication used to treat African trypanosomiasis (sleeping sickness) caused by Trypanosoma brucei gambiense. It is effective against both first and second stage disease. Some evidence also supports its use in Chagas disease. It is taken by mouth.

Common side effects include nausea, vomiting, headache, and trouble sleeping. Other side effects may include QT prolongation, psychosis, and low white blood cells. It is unclear if use during pregnancy or breast feeding is safe. Fexinidazole is in the antiparasitic and the nitroimidazole family of medications. It is believed to work by turning on certain enzymes within the parasites that result in their death.

Fexinidazole was first described in 1978. It was given a positive opinion by the European Medicines Agency in 2018. It is on the World Health Organization's List of Essential Medicines. Development for sleeping sickness was funded by the Drugs for Neglected Diseases initiative in collaboration with Sanofi. Fexinidazole was approved for medical use in the United States in July 2021.

Medical use

Sleeping sickness
A trial in Africa found fexinidazole to be 91% effective at treating sleeping sickness. Though less effective than nifurtimox with eflornithine in severe disease, fexinidazole has the benefit that it can be taken by mouth.

Fexinidazole is the first drug candidate for the treatment of advanced-stage sleeping sickness in thirty years.

Other
It has activity against Trypanosoma cruzi, Tritrichomonas foetus, Trichomonas vaginalis, Entamoeba histolytica, and Trypanosoma brucei. It has not been found to be useful for visceral leishmaniasis.

Mechanism of action
The biologically relevant active metabolites in vivo are the sulfoxide and sulfone.

History
Fexinidazole was discovered by the German pharmaceutical company Hoechst AG, but its development as a pharmaceutical was halted in the 1980s.

The US Food and Drug Administration granted the application for fexinidazole orphan drug designation.

Society and culture
Fexinidazole Winthrop, a Sanofi-Aventis product developed with the Drugs for Neglected Diseases Initiative (DNDi), received a positive endorsement from the European Medicines Agency in 2018, for use in non-European markets. It was approved for the treatment of Trypanosoma brucei gambiense human African trypanosomiasis (HAT) in the Democratic Republic of the Congo (DRC) in December 2018. Fexinidazole was included in the 'role of honour' in Préscrire magazine's 2020 prize list.Fexinidazole Winthrop° (fexinidazole) : au Tableau d'Honneur 2020

Veterinary use
Fexinidazole is promising in African animal trypanosomiasis. Torreele et al. 2010 found the drug to be effective against T. b. gambiense infection of mice, rats, rabbits and beagles. They also found no toxicity in any of them, including a lack of mutagenicity despite in vitro mutagenicity.

References

External links
 

Antiparasitic agents
German inventions
Nitroimidazoles
Phenol ethers
Thioethers
World Health Organization essential medicines
Wikipedia medicine articles ready to translate
Orphan drugs